William Ernest Pinckert (May 1, 1907 – August 30, 1977) was an American football halfback. He played college football at the University of Southern California (USC) under head coach Howard Jones. Pinckert played professionally in the National Football League (NFL) from 1932 to 1940 with the Boston Braves/Redskins, who then moved to Washington, D.C. Pinckert was inducted into the College Football Hall of Fame in 1957.

Early life
A younger brother of astrologer Jeane Dixon, Pinckert and his nine siblings were the children of Richard Franz Pinckert, a native of Gräfenhainichen, Wittenberg, 
Saxony-Anhalt, and his wife, Luise Johanne Emma ( Graefe), both Roman Catholics.

College career
Pinckert was consensus selection on the 1930 College Football All-America Team. Tommy Trojan, officially known as the Trojan Shrine was based on a variety of USC football players, including Russ Saunders and Pinckert. The lower half in particular is based on Ernie Pinckert.

Professional career
Pinckert played in the NFL between 1932 and 1940 for the Boston Braves and the Washington Redskins.

Death
Pinckert died on August 30, 1977, at his home in the West Los Angeles neighborhood of Los Angeles.

References

External links
 
 
 

1907 births
1977 deaths
American football halfbacks
Boston Braves (NFL) players
Boston Redskins players
USC Trojans football players
Washington Redskins players
All-American college football players
College Football Hall of Fame inductees
People from Medford, Wisconsin
Sportspeople from San Bernardino, California
Players of American football from California
American people of German descent
Catholics from California
Catholics from Wisconsin